Sepak takraw was contested at the 2005 Asian Indoor Games in The Mall Bangkapi, Bangkok, Thailand from November 15 to November 18.

Medalists

Medal table

Results

Men

1st round
15 November

2nd round
16 November

Knockout round

Women

1st round
15 November

2nd round
16 November

Knockout round

References
2005 Indoor Games Official Website

2005 Asian Indoor Games events
2005